Gay Life is a documentary television programme broadcast by London Weekend Television (LWT) in 1980. It was produced by Michael Atwell at LWT's London Minorities Unit, and was the United Kingdom's first LGBT television series.

Production 
Michael Atwell said programme could claim to be "the first time in the world that a major national TV company has given a whole series to gays". Three members of Gay Life production team were gay, including Attwell, who said the staff felt that they were "in a sense trying to ride two horsesputting forward the gay viewpoint and relating to non-gay people". This was encapsulated for the production team by the slogan "For and about gays". Gay Life was first broadcast late on a Sunday evening in the London region, on 10 February 1980 at 11:30 pm. Notable contributors included comedian Graham Chapman, who spoke of his experience as a gay parent in the February 24 episode.

Reception 
The debut episode was reviewed by John Russell Taylor in the following week's issue of Gay News. In his essay "Something for Everyone" included in the critical theory book Queer TV: Theories, Histories, Politics, edited by Glyn Davis and Gary Needham, Gregory Woods wrote Taylor's review had raised "basic but crucial questions that would keep cropping up in relation to gay television programmes for the next two decades". Taylor's questions concerned the visibility of men in drag and leather who because of their frequent appearances as representative of the gay community in news reports "led the straight media to treat gayness as extraordinary, and therefore had to seek out vivid representatives of it in order to confirm their own per-constructed idea of it" and also his belief that the programme may adopt divided aims in an attempt to appeal to both "uncomprehending straights" and its desire to "preach to the converted".

Richard Ingrams negatively reviewed the 10 July 1981 episode of Gay Life as the television critic for The Spectator. In his column he wrote that "I at last managed to catch up with the lesbians on Sunday, and about time too is all that I can say". The episode discussed artificial insemination of which Ingrams wrote that it was a "far more satisfactory method in many lesbian eyes because one can ensure that the donor is a suitable person—presumably a Guardian-reading Gay. Various mournful specimens were wheeled on to hail this Brave New World." Ingrams further criticised Gay Life by saying:

and concluded by writing:

Episodes

Series 1 (1980) 
All episodes were originally broadcast without title cards. Episodes rebroadcast in 1981 were given titles.

Series 2 (1981)

References

External links 

 
 

1980 British television series debuts
1981 British television series endings
1980s British LGBT-related television series
1980 in LGBT history
English-language television shows
London Weekend Television shows